Chuang Chia-jung and Lisa Raymond were the defending champions, but they decided to not compete this year.
Other Taiwanese-American pair won this tournament. Chang Kai-chen and Lilia Osterloh defeated Shuko Aoyama and Rika Fujiwara 6–0, 6–3 in the final.

Seeds

Draw

Draw

References
 Doubles Draw

Hp Open - Doubles
2010 HP Open